Portage Township is one of the twelve townships of Ottawa County, Ohio, United States.  The 2000 census found 1,634 people in the unincorporated portions of the township.

Communities

Geography
Located in the eastern part of the county on the Marblehead Peninsula, it borders the following townships:
Put-in-Bay Township - north, across Lake Erie
Catawba Island Township - northeast
Danbury Township - east
Margaretta Township, Erie County - south, across Sandusky Bay
Riley Township, Sandusky County - southwest corner, across Sandusky Bay
Bay Township - west
Erie Township - northwest

Most of the city of Port Clinton, the county seat of Ottawa County, is located northwest of the township.

Name and history
Statewide, other Portage Townships are located in Hancock and Wood counties.

Government
The township is governed by a three-member board of trustees, who are elected in November of odd-numbered years to a four-year term beginning on the following January 1. Two are elected in the year after the presidential election and one is elected in the year before it. There is also an elected township fiscal officer, who serves a four-year term beginning on April 1 of the year after the election, which is held in November of the year before the presidential election. Vacancies in the fiscal officership or on the board of trustees are filled by the remaining trustees.

References

External links
County website

Townships in Ottawa County, Ohio
Townships in Ohio